Santana Brothers (sometimes credited as simply Brothers) is a 1994 album by Carlos Santana, his brother Jorge, and his nephew Carlos Hernandez. It reached 191 on the Billboard 200 album chart.

Track listing
 "Transmutation/Industrial" (Santana, Santana) - 6:11
 "Thoughts" (Hernandez) - 2:49
 "Luz Amor y Vida" (Carlos Santana) - 5:07
 "En Aranjuez Con Tu Amor" (Joaquín Rodrigo) - 6:04
 "Contigo (With You)" (Santana, Santana) - 4:53
 "Blues Latino" (Javier Vargas, Espinoza) - 5:44
 "La Danza" (Hernandez, Santana, Santana) - 6:53
 "Brujo" (Hernandez, Carlos Santana) - 4:06
 "The Trip" (Santana, Santana) - 3:53
 "Reflections" (Jorge Santana) - 3:43
 "Morning in Marin" (Djalma de Andrade) - 2:28

Personnel
 Carlos Santana – guitar (tracks 3-10), producer
 Jorge Santana – guitar (tracks 1, 4-5, 7 & 9-11), producer
 Carlos Hernandez – guitar (tracks 1-2 & 7-10)
 Chester Thompson – keyboards (tracks 2-10)
 Myron Dove – bass (tracks 2-10) 
 Billy Johnson – drums (tracks 4-8) 
 Karl Perazzo – percussion (tracks 2-3 & 5-6), congas (tracks 2-3, 5, 7 & 10), timbales (tracks 3, 5 & 10)
 Mixed by Devon Rietveld (tracks 1-8 & 10-11) and Jim Gaines (tracks 1 & 9) 
 Recorded by Arne Frager (tracks 1-3, 9 & 11) and Devon Rietveld 
 Recorded by [assisted by] & mixed by [assisted by] Ken Walden and Kent Matcke 
 Mastered by Bernie Grundman

References

1994 albums
Albums produced by Carlos Santana
Carlos Santana albums